Jacques Jaugeon was a French scholar and the royal typographer during the reign of King Louis XIV. He was a member of the Bignon Commission charged by the minister Colbert to compile the Description of the Arts and Trades. One of the commission's first fields of inquiry was into printing and typography, where Jaugeon assisted Father Truchet in creating the first typographic point system and the Romain du Roi ("King's Roman"), the font later developed into Times New Roman.

French typographers and type designers
Year of birth missing
Year of death missing